The Miss Tierra República Dominicana 2011 pageant was held on October 14, 2011. This year 33 candidates competed for the national earth crown. The winner represented the Dominican Republic at the Miss Earth 2011 beauty pageant, which was held in the Philippines.

Results

Special awards
 Miss Photogenic (voted by press reporters) - Breini Feliz (Barahona)
 Miss Congeniality (voted by contestants) -  Sarah Féliz (Monseñor Nouel)
 Best Face -  Veronica Batista (San Juan)
 Miss Cultura - Idelkis Sierra (Distrito Nacional)

Delegates

Crossovers
Contestants who previously competed at other beauty pageants or are expected to:
Miss Dominican Republic 2010
 Monseñor Nouel: Sarah Féliz (as Miss Bahoruco)

External links
 Official Website

Miss Dominican Republic
2011 beauty pageants
2011 in the Dominican Republic